Ziomek is a Polish surname. Notable people with the surname include:

Kaja Ziomek (born 1997), Polish speed skater
Kevin Ziomek (born 1992), American baseball player

See also

Polish-language surnames